Apatow is a surname. Notable people with the surname include:
Iris Apatow (born 2002), American actress and socialite
Judd Apatow (born 1967), American producer, writer, director, comedian and actor
Apatow Productions, American film and television production company founded by Judd
Maude Apatow (born 1997), American actress

Jewish surnames